Carlos Sosa may refer to:
Carlos Sosa, Musician and founder of Grooveline Horns
Carlos Sosa (footballer) (1919–2009), Argentine footballer
DJ Sneak (Carlos Sosa, born 1969), Puerto Rican disc jockey
Carlos Sosa, former member of the band Chocolate
Carlos Sosa, character in The OA